Orior Lower (from , the name of an ancient Gaelic territory) is a barony in County Armagh, Northern Ireland. It lies in the east of the county and borders County Down with its eastern boundary. It is bordered by seven other baronies: Fews Upper to the south-west; Fews Lower to the west; Oneilland West to the north-west; Oneilland East to the north; Iveagh Lower, Lower Half to the north-east; Iveagh Upper, Upper Half to the east; and Orior Upper to the south. A small enclave of Orior Lower resides in the east of Orior Upper.

List of main settlements
Below is a list of settlements within Orior Lower:

Towns
Bessbrook
Tandragee

Villages and population centres
Eleven Lane Ends
Forkhill
Poyntzpass (split with Iveagh Upper, Upper Half)
Jerrettspass
Laurelvale
Loughgilly (also part in the baronies of Fews Lower and Orior Upper)

List of civil parishes
Below is a list of civil parishes in Orior Lower:
Ballymore
Forkill
Killevy (split with barony of Orior Upper)
Kilmore (split with barony of Oneilland West, not be confused with separate civil parish of Kilmore in County Down)
Loughgilly (split with baronies of Fews Upper and Orior Upper)

References